Nancy Roa Cuenco is a Filipino former politician. She served as the representative for the 2nd district of Cebu City from 1998 to 2001. She was married to former Cebu City 2nd district representative Antonio Cuenco whom she has four children namely Cebu City councilor James Anthony Cuenco, former Cebu City councilor Ronald Cuenco, Antonio Cuenco Jr., and Cynthia Cuenco-Dizon.

She only served a single term until which she was succeeded by her husband who went on to serve for another nine consecutive years. Her husband died on June 27, 2020 due to the effects of COVID-19.

References 

People from Cebu City
Members of the House of Representatives of the Philippines from Cebu City
Living people
Probinsya Muna Development Initiative politicians
Year of birth missing (living people)